The Leader of the Opposition in the Tripura Legislative Assembly is an elected Member of Legislative Assembly who leads the official opposition in the Tripura Legislative Assembly. Official Opposition is a term used in Tripura Legislative Assembly to designate the political party which has secured the second largest number of seats in Tripura assembly. In order to get formal recognition, the party must have at least 10% of total membership of the Legislative Assembly. Since 1963, the Tripura Legislative Assembly has had 12 leaders of the opposition.

Role
The Opposition's main role is to question the government of the day and hold them accountable to the public. The Opposition is equally responsible in upholding the best interests of the people of the country. They have to ensure that the Government does not take any steps, which might have negative effects on the people of the state. There are actions of the ruling party which may be beneficial to the masses and opposition is expected to support such steps.

List of leaders of the opposition

References

 
 
Tripura Legislative Assembly
Leaders of the Opposition